Petrov Ridge (‘Petrov Rid’ \pe-'trov 'rid\ is the rocky, partly ice-covered ridge extending 5.5 km in east-southeast to west-northwest direction, 2.5 km wide and rising to 1408 m in the north foothills of Foster Plateau on Danco Coast in Graham Land, Antarctica.  It surmounts Krebs Glacier to the south-southwest, Charlotte Bay to the northwest and Bozhinov Glacier to the north-northeast.

The ridge is named after the Bulgarian poet Valeri Petrov (born Valeri Mevorah, 1920-2014).

Location
British mapping in 1978.

Maps
British Antarctic Territory. Scale 1:200000 topographic map. DOS 610 Series, Sheet W 64 60. Directorate of Overseas Surveys, Tolworth, UK, 1978.
 Antarctic Digital Database (ADD). Scale 1:250000 topographic map of Antarctica. Scientific Committee on Antarctic Research (SCAR). Since 1993, regularly upgraded and updated.

Notes

References
 Bulgarian Antarctic Gazetteer. Antarctic Place-names Commission. (details in Bulgarian, basic data in English)
 Petrov Ridge. SCAR Composite Gazetteer of Antarctica

External links
 Petrov Ridge. Copernix satellite image

Ridges of Graham Land
Bulgaria and the Antarctic
Danco Coast